Andy Zeffer is an artist who creates paintings in various mediums.

He is also a former novelist. His novel Going Down in La-La Land was published in 2006. The book is centered on an actor named Adam Zeller, who moves to Los Angeles. Going Down in La-La Land was a 2006 Lambda Literary Award finalist.

Independent filmmaker Casper Andreas produced and directed the film Going Down in LA-LA Land, which was released in 2011.

References

American male novelists
Eugene Lang College alumni
Year of birth missing (living people)
Living people
21st-century American novelists
American gay writers
American LGBT novelists
21st-century American male writers
Novelists from New York (state)
21st-century American LGBT people